Adam Geghami Khudoyan (February 21, 1921, Yerevan, Armenia - 2000, Yerevan) was an Armenian composer, awarded by the Renowned Activist of the Arts of Armenia official title.

He finished the Yerevan State Conservatory in 1945. He directed the Composer's House of Armenia, was the secretary of the Composer's Union of Armenia. Khudoyan composed three cello sonatas, cello duo sonata and cello nostalgia. In 1961 he wrote "Sonata for Cello Solo No. 1".

Şahan Arzruni wrote: "I personally find strong parallels between Khudoyan's approach to music and that of Mussorgsky. Like Mussorgsky, Khudoyan employed chordal progressions
that are unusual, unbounded, even unacceptable to the traditional rules of harmony.

External links
Biography

References

1921 births
2000 deaths
Musicians from Yerevan
Armenian composers
Soviet composers
Soviet male composers
Komitas State Conservatory of Yerevan alumni
20th-century classical musicians
20th-century composers
20th-century male musicians